A splinter skill is an "ability to do a specific task that does not generalize to other tasks", according to Occupational Therapy for Physical Dysfunction.  Cheatum and Hammond define them as skills learned that are above the child's age. Jacks writes that they are skills that are not "an integral part of the orderly sequential development"; that is, skills mastered before they are developmentally expected.

According to Ayres and Robbins, an example is "the ability to play a particular piece on the piano without having the generalized ability to play the piano".

References 

Skills
Learning